Plektrum is the 19th studio album by Swedish singer/songwriter Tomas Ledin, released in June 2006. In November of the same year, the album was re-issued as a 2-CD-set with a bonus track on disc 1 as well as a full bonus disc, called Ledin Live 2006, featuring 14 tracks recorded during Ledin's summer tour 2006.

Album information

After taking a somewhat different musical direction with its predecessor Med vidöppna fönster in 2004, Tomas Ledin was back with a typical pop/rock album in June 2006 when he released "Plektrum". The title of the album comes from the so-called plectrum, a small flat tool which is used for playing string instruments, most commonly a guitar. Consequently, the sound on this album relies heavily on electric and acoustic guitar sound. Half of the 10 tracks on "Plektrum" are up-tempo pop/rock compositions (tracks 1, 2, 3, 5, 9), whereas the other half are ballads with a typical Ledin sound and, as for the example of "Hela huset sov", critical lyrics.

Recording for the album took place in Bell Studio, Stockholm, with the exception of "Jag kanske inte säger det så ofta", which was recorded at Boon Studio and produced by Lasse Andersson. The rest of the album was produced by Jörgen Ingeström and Bo Reimer.

Track listing

Singles & reception

"Plektrum" includes a re-recording of the Ledin composition "Vi är på gång", which was originally released in 1983 in Swedish and English ("We're On The Beat"). In 2006, the title became Sweden's official song for this year's soccer world championships, the 2006 FIFA World Cup, in Germany. For this occasion, Ledin party re-wrote the lyrics and released the song on single in May 2006. Predictably, the single charted high in the Swedish Singles Chart and eventually gave Ledin his biggest chart-hit since 1990s "En del av mitt hjärta" by reaching the top5. According to IFPI Sweden, the single was certified 4× Platinum as early as May 17, just a week after its release.

The first single released from "Plektrum", some two months before the album was released, was "Gilla läget", a modern combination of pop and rock. The single immediately entered the Swedish Singles Chart and stayed on it for 17 weeks, eventually peaking at number 14. Additionally, it also managed to enter the important Swedish radio chart Svensktoppen for one week at number 9.

The album itself entered the Swedish albums chart, Sverigetopplistan, at number 1, becoming Ledin's first studio album in ten years which topped the charts. In August, the album was certified Gold.

Two more tracks from "Plektrum" were tested for the Svensktoppen charts in summer and winter 2006: "Jag kanske inte säger det så ofta" and "Änglar i snön". However, neither one managed to enter the top10.

Re-release: Ledin Live 2006

On November 29, 2006, "Plektrum" was re-released as a 2-CD set. For this re-issue, the word "Ledin" on the cover was coloured in red instead of yellow. Besides including a new version of the track "Änglar i snön" on disc 1, the second disc of this 2-CD set featured 14 songs which were recorded during Tomas Ledin's live tour the previous summer. This bonus disc, titled "Ledin Live 2006", is a shortened version of a digital album called "Live sommar 2006", which had been released on August 14, 2006. This original version included three more tracks, making it a total of 17, which was the complete live-set of Ledin's tour that summer.

{{Track listing
| collapsed       = yes
| headline        = Live sommar 2006
| extra_column    = Title (English translation)
| total_length    = no
| title1          = Inte en chans
| writer1         = Tomas Ledin
| extra1          = Not a chance
| length1         = 4:22
| title2          = Lika hopplöst förälskad
| writer2         = Tomas Ledin
| extra2          = Like hopelessly in love
| length2         = 5:42
| title3          = På vingar av stål
| writer3         = Tomas Ledin
| extra3          = On wings of steel
| length3         = 5:03
| title4          = Det ligger i luften
| writer4         = Tomas Ledin
| extra4          = It's in the air
| length4         = 2:19
| title5          = Jag kanske inte säger det så ofta
| writer5         = Tomas Ledin, Lasse Andersson
| extra5          = I might not say it very often
| length5         = 5:17
| title6          = En dag på stranden
| writer6         = Tomas Ledin
| extra6          = A day at the beach"
| length6         = 5:18
| title7          = Helt galen i dig
| writer7         = Tomas Ledin
| extra7          = Totally crazy about you| length7         = 4:17
| title8          = Ja' ville va'
| writer8         = Tomas Ledin
| extra8          = I wanted to be| length8         = 3:01
| title9          = I natt är jag din
| writer9         = Tomas Ledin
| extra9          = Tonight I am yours| length9         = 7:30
| title10          = Sommaren är kort
| writer10         = Tomas Ledin
| extra10          = The summer is short| length10         = 4:24
| title11          = En del av mitt hjärta
| writer11         = Tomas Ledin
| extra11          = A part of my heart| length11         = 5:54
| title12          = Gilla läget
| writer12         = Tomas Ledin
| extra12          = Like the situation| length12         = 4:44
| title13          = Just nu
| writer13         = Tomas Ledin
| extra13          = Right now| length13         = 3:48
| title14          = En man som älskar
| writer14         = Tomas Ledin
| extra14          = A man who loves| length14         = 3:51
| title15          = Om så bara för en kväll
| writer15         = Tomas Ledin
| extra15          = If only for one night| length15         = 7:02
| title16          = Hon gör allt för att göra mig lycklig
| writer16         = Tomas Ledin
| extra16          = She does everything to make me happy| length16         = 4:06
| title17          = Sensuella Isabella
| writer17         = Tomas Ledin
| extra17          = Sensual Isabella| length17         = 7:20
}}

Personnel

The following musicians participated in the recording sessions for the "Plektrum" album:

Tomas Ledin: vocals, guitar
Jörgen Ingeström: keyboard, drums-programming, bass-programming, guitar, background vocals
Sebastian Nylund: guitar
Ove Andersson: bass, backing vocals
Bo Reimer: percussion
Lasse Andersson: keyboard, drums, guitar, percussion
Joakim Milder: String-arrangement, conductor
Stockholm Session Strings
Matthias Venge: guitar
Gustav Pettersson: background vocalsadditional for bonus track on disc 1 ("Änglar i snön" decemberversion):Ola Gustavsson: guitar
Jarmo Lindell: bass
Johan Franzon: drums, percussion

The live recordings on the bonus disc "Ledin Live 2006"'' feature the following musicians:

Tomas Ledin: vocals, guitar, harmonica
Jörgen Ingströn: keyboard, background vocals
Sebastian Nylund: guitar, background vocals
Ove Andersson: bass
Johan Franzon: drums

References

2006 albums
Tomas Ledin albums